Song Ok-sook (born August 14, 1960) is a South Korean actress. She has appeared in supporting roles in numerous television dramas, including Winter Sonata, Beethoven Virus, More Charming by the Day, and Missing You.

Song is also a full-time professor in the Department of Film Arts at the Dong-Ah Institute of Media and Arts since 2005. She is an advocate of adoption.

Filmography

Television series

Film

Theater

Awards and nominations

References

External links
 Song Ok-sook at Bom Entertainment
 
 
 
 

South Korean television actresses
South Korean film actresses
South Korean stage actresses
Chung-Ang University alumni
Yonsei University alumni
Living people
1960 births
L&Holdings artists